Kalber (also Romanized as Kālber and Kālbar; also known as Kālber-e Bālā) is a village in Negur Rural District, Dashtiari District, Chabahar County, Sistan and Baluchestan Province, Iran. At the 2006 census, its population was 1,085, in 197 families.

References 

Kalber Co Is Arak/Iran

Populated places in Dashtiari County